Midnight Boom is the third album by indie rock band The Kills, released on March 10, 2008, through Domino Records (March 17, 2008, in the United States). It was recorded at the Key Club Recording Company in Benton Harbor, Michigan. The title refers to the hours from midnight to 6 a.m., in which the band was at the creative peak, writing material for the album.

Promotion

"U.R.A. Fever" was released as the lead single from the album on December 3, 2007. The second single, "Cheap and Cheerful", was released on February 25, 2008. "Last Day of Magic" was released as the third single on June 15, 2008
Two final singles from the album were "Tape Song", released on November 16, 2008, and "Black Balloon", released on March 22, 2009. Both songs have charted in France.

"Sour Cherry" was featured on an episode of the TV series Gossip Girl, and became popular. "Sour Cherry" was also featured in The House Bunny. "What New York Used to Be" was used in the film Push.

Commercial performance
Midnight Boom was the band's first album that charted on the Billboard 200 in the U.S., peaking at number 133. It has also charted at number 16 on the Independent Albums, number 9 on Top Tastemaker Albums, and topped the Top Heatseekers Albums chart. In Europe, it reached number 47 on the UK Albums Chart, and has also charted in Austria, Belgium, France, the Netherlands and Switzerland. In 2009. It was awarded a silver certification from the Independent Music Companies Association which indicated sales of at least 30,000 copies throughout Europe.

Critical reception

The album received positive reviews from music critics. At Metacritic, which assigns a normalized rating out of 100 to reviews from mainstream critics, the album received an average score of 75, based on 31 reviews.

Track listing

Personnel

The Kills
Alison Mosshart – vocals, guitar, production
Jamie Hince – vocals, guitar, drums, percussion, production

Technical personnel
Tom Elmhirst – audio engineering, mixing
Jason Lader – engineering
Jessica Ruffins – engineering
Bill Skibbe – engineering
Andy Taub – engineering

Charts

References

2008 albums
Albums produced by Jamie Hince
Albums produced by XXXChange
Domino Recording Company albums
The Kills albums